Joseph Numa Wenger (June 7, 1901 – September 2, 1970) was a Rear-Admiral of the United States Navy who served as the first Deputy Director of the Armed Forces Security Agency (AFSA), and later as the first Vice Director of the National Security Agency, from December 1952 to November 1953, after the separate divisions of the AFSA merged into the NSA. Wenger was one of the leaders responsible for the development of the NSA. He was a native of Patterson, Louisiana.

Work
Wenger was "one of the architects of centralized cryptology." In February 1942 Navy power struggles led to the ousting of Laurance Safford from OP-20-G; with two new sections to be headed by Wenger (Communications: Decryption and Translation) and John R. Redman (Communications: Combat Intelligence). Safford was removed from current intelligence to a support and research role. Safford was sidelined for the remainder of the war, as ultimately was Joseph Rochefort.

Wenger was integral in starting the AFSA (Armed Forces Security Agency), the predecessor to the NSA. During World War II he suggested that the Navy spend $2 million "to build 360 of its own four wheel bombes" to break the effective British monopoly on the Bombe. He died in 1970.

See also
Laurance Safford

References

External links
List of former Vice/Deputy Directors of the NSA.
Navy Cryptology history

1901 births
1970 deaths
Intelligence analysts
Deputy Directors of the National Security Agency
People from Patterson, Louisiana
United States Navy personnel of World War II